Dicrossus filamentosus is a species of dwarf cichlid fish. It occurs in the Rio Negro and Orinoco basins of Colombia, Venezuela, and Brazil.

These fish lays eggs on leaves or directly on the substrate. The female takes care of the fry alone, since it chases the male away after laying. The eggs hatch 3 days later.

In captivity
This omnivorous fish is better kept in temperatures between 24 - 29, pH 4 – 6,8 and dH between 5 - 8. The tank should have a capacity of at least 60 litres, with plenty hiding spaces.

References

External links

Geophagini
Freshwater fish of Brazil
Freshwater fish of Colombia
Fish of Venezuela
Fish described in 1958